In mathematics, an exceptional isomorphism, also called an accidental isomorphism, is an isomorphism between members ai and bj of two families, usually infinite, of mathematical objects, that is not an example of a pattern of such isomorphisms. These coincidences are at times considered a matter of trivia, but in other respects they can give rise to other phenomena, notably exceptional objects. In the following, coincidences are listed wherever they occur.

Groups

Finite simple groups 
The exceptional isomorphisms between the series of finite simple groups mostly involve projective special linear groups and alternating groups, and are:
  the smallest non-abelian simple group (order 60) – icosahedral symmetry;
  the second-smallest non-abelian simple group (order 168) – PSL(2,7);
 
 
  between a projective special orthogonal group and a projective symplectic group.

Alternating groups and symmetric groups 

There are coincidences between symmetric/alternating groups and small groups of Lie type/polyhedral groups:
  Dihedral group of order 6,
  tetrahedral group,
  full tetrahedral group  octahedral group,
  icosahedral group,
 ,
 
 
 
 

There are also some coincidences with symmetries of regular polyhedra: the alternating group A5 agrees with the icosahedral group (itself an exceptional object), and the double cover of the alternating group A5 is the binary icosahedral group.

Trivial group 
The trivial group arises in numerous ways. The trivial group is often omitted from the beginning of a classical family. For instance:
 , the cyclic group of order 1;
 , the alternating group on 0, 1, or 2 letters;
 , the symmetric group on 0 or 1 letters;
 , linear groups of a 0-dimensional vector space;
 , linear groups of a 1-dimensional vector space
 and many others.

Spheres 
The spheres S0, S1, and S3 admit group structures, which can be described in many ways:
 , the last being the group of units of the integers ,
  circle group
  unit quaternions.

Spin groups 

 
 
 

Also, Spin(8) has an exceptional order 3 triality automorphism

Coxeter–Dynkin diagrams 

There are some exceptional isomorphisms of Dynkin diagrams, yielding isomorphisms of the corresponding Coxeter groups and of polytopes realizing the symmetries, as well as isomorphisms of lie algebras whose root systems are described by the same diagrams. These are:

See also 
 Exceptional object
 Mathematical coincidence, for numerical coincidences

Notes

References 

Mathematical relations